Sassenia is an extinct genus of prehistoric coelacanth.

See also

 Sarcopterygii
 List of sarcopterygians
 List of prehistoric bony fish

References

Rhabdodermatidae